Naomi King Biden Neal (née Biden; born December 21, 1993) is an American lawyer and a granddaughter of U.S. President Joe Biden. The eldest daughter of Hunter Biden and Kathleen Buhle, she grew up in Washington, D.C. and attended the University of Pennsylvania. Biden is a graduate of Columbia Law School and works as an associate at the law firm Arnold & Porter.

A member of the First family of the United States, she has lived in the White House with her grandfather and step-grandmother since August 2021. Biden accompanied them on official visits to China, Brazil, Turkey, New Zealand, and Trinidad and Tobago while they were serving as Vice President and Second Lady.

In November 2022, she became the first granddaughter of a president to marry at the White House. According to the White House Historical Association, Biden's wedding was the first to take place on the South Lawn.

Early life, education, and family 
Biden was born on December 21, 1993 to Hunter Biden and Kathleen Buhle. She has two younger sisters, Finnegan and Roberta ("Maisy"), a half-brother named Beau from her father's second marriage to South African filmmaker Melissa Cohen, and one half-sister from her father's relationship with Lunden Alexis Roberts. The eldest grandchild of U.S. President Joe Biden, she was named after his daughter, Naomi Christina Biden, who at age 1 was killed, along with his first wife, Neilia Hunter Biden, in a 1972 car crash. Joe Biden married Jill Tracy Jacobs in 1977.

Naomi King Biden grew up in Washington, D.C. She attended Sidwell Friends School, a private Quaker school in Washington, D.C. She majored in international relations at the University of Pennsylvania, where she was a classmate and friend of First Daughter Tiffany Trump, and earned her Juris Doctor degree from Columbia Law School.

Public life and career 

Biden attended the 2008 Democratic National Convention with her family, prior to the 2008 United States presidential election.

In May 2013, Biden accompanied her grandfather and step-grandmother, at the time the Vice President and Second Lady of the United States, on an official trip to Trinidad and Tobago. While there, she met with Christian and Anura Carmona, the children of President Anthony Carmona. She later accompanied the vice president on official visits to Brazil, China, Turkey, and New Zealand.

Biden encouraged her grandfather to run in the 2020 United States presidential election against incumbent U.S. President Donald Trump, calling a family meeting in 2019 to persuade him to enter the race. She gave a speech supporting her grandfather in a video that played during the 2020 Democratic National Convention.

Biden works as an international arbitration associate attorney at Arnold & Porter, having started with the law firm in 2020.

Personal life 
Biden met Peter George Heermann Neal, an associate at Georgetown Law's Center on National Security, in East Hampton, New York on June 8, 2018, after being set up on a date by a mutual friend. In August 2021, the couple moved into the White House. In September 2021, Neal proposed to Biden in Jackson Hole, Wyoming. On November 19, 2022, the couple married in a joint Catholic-Presbyterian ceremony held on the South Lawn of the White House.

A wedding luncheon was hosted by President and First Lady Biden in the State Dining Room of the White House. It was the first wedding to ever be held on the South Lawn, according to the White House Historical Association, and was the first time a president's granddaughter was married at the White House.

References

1993 births
Living people
Lawyers from Washington, D.C.
Catholics from Washington, D.C.
Naomi
Washington, D.C., Democrats
Columbia Law School alumni
University of Pennsylvania alumni
Sidwell Friends School alumni
20th-century American women
21st-century American lawyers
21st-century American women lawyers